Eze Ènweleána II Obidiegwu Onyesoh is the 16th  recorded, and currently ruling, Eze Nri of the Kingdom of Nri in modern-day southeastern Nigeria. He reigns over the remnant of one of the oldest kingdoms in contemporary Nigeria, and retains a ritual significance as the symbol of one of that country's most historically relevant peoples.

References 

Kingdom of Nri
Nri monarchs
Year of birth missing (living people)
Living people